The Evangelist (German: Der Evangelimann) is a 1924 German silent drama film directed by Holger-Madsen and starring Paul Hartmann, Hanni Weisse and Elisabeth Bergner. It is based on the 1895 opera Der Evangelimann by Wilhelm Kienzl.

The film's sets were designed by the art director Botho Hoefer. It was released by the German major studio UFA.

Cast
 Paul Hartmann as Evangelimann, Lehrer einer Klosterschule  
 Hanni Weisse as Mutter / Tochter  
 Jacob Feldhammer as Bruder des Evangelimanns  
 Heinrich Peer as Engel, Justitiar des Stiftes St. Othmar  
 Elisabeth Bergner as Magdalena  
 Hans Leiter as Der Giraffe  
 Holger-Madsen as Schneider Zitterbart  
 Dr. Jockl as Die Bulldogge  
 Harry Halm as Bettelbub 
 Adolphe Engers 
 Loni Nest 
 Sigrid Onegin

References

Bibliography
 Grange, William. Cultural Chronicle of the Weimar Republic. Scarecrow Press, 2008.

External links

1924 films
1924 drama films
German drama films
Films of the Weimar Republic
Films directed by Holger-Madsen
Films produced by Erich Pommer
German silent feature films
German black-and-white films
Films based on operas
UFA GmbH films
Silent drama films
1920s German films
1920s German-language films